Hicksville is a station on the Main Line and Port Jefferson Branch of the Long Island Rail Road located in Hicksville, New York. It is the busiest station east of Jamaica and Penn Station by combined weekday/weekend ridership.

The station is at Newbridge Road (Route 106) and West Barclay Street. It has two island platforms and three tracks. It is wheelchair accessible, with an elevator to each platform from street level. It is served by eight Nassau Inter-County Express routes and two cab services on the ground level of the station.

History
Hicksville station's first depot opened on March 1, 1837, as the temporary terminus of the LIRR. The hamlet and the station were both founded by Valentine Hicks, the son of an abolitionist preacher who also briefly served as an LIRR President. The line expanded to Farmingdale in 1841, after a delay caused by the depression that had begun with the Panic of 1837. In 1854, the station gained a line known as the Hicksville and Syosset Railroad that later became the Port Jefferson Branch of the LIRR. Ten years later on July 15, 1864, the first depot burned down. A second depot opened in September 1873, and was moved to a private location in 1909. The third depot opened on October 30, 1909, and was razed in November 1962 as the current elevated structure was being built. The elevated station opened on September 12, 1964, and was electrified in October 1970. In 1965 an eagle of the demolished Penn Station was installed in the Hicksville station parking lot.

The station underwent a full renovation beginning in early 2014. The $121 million renovation included replacing station platforms, escalators, elevators, waiting rooms, canopies, and lighting. Security cameras were also added during the renovation. Construction was estimated to last through 2017, and was expected to be completed by August 2018. Platform A was the first platform to be rebuilt, reopening in September 2017. The electrical substation at Hicksville station will be replaced as part of the Main Line third track project. The rehabilitation project was officially completed in September 2018.

Station layout
Generally, Platform A serves westbound trains and Platform B serves eastbound trains. Track 2 operates with the flow of rush hour, handling westbound trains in the morning and eastbound trains in the evening, though some westbound trains will use Platform B. Most Montauk Branch trains pass through the station without stopping. East of the station, the Port Jefferson Branch splits from the Main Line at DIVIDE Interlocking.

References

External links

Steve Lynch's LIRR Maps, Photos, Charts, etc. (TrainsAreFun.com)
Hicksville Station History
1962 Reconstruction Pamphlet; Pages 1, 2, 3, and 4
DIVIDE Interlocking (The LIRR Today)
 Newbridge Road entrance from Google Maps Street View
Platforms from Google Maps Street View

Railway stations in the United States opened in 1837
Long Island Rail Road stations in Nassau County, New York
Oyster Bay (town), New York
1837 establishments in New York (state)